The Players Club: Music From and Inspired by the New Line Cinema Motion Picture is the soundtrack to Ice Cube's 1998 film The Players Club. It was released on March 17, 1998 through Heavyweight Records, Sony Music Soundtrax and Epic Records and consists of hip hop and contemporary R&B music. The album features songs from the film's star, Ice Cube, as well as Mr. Short Khop, Brownstone, Changing Faces, Dalvin DeGrate, DJ Spinderella, DMX, Jay-Z, Kurupt, Lil' Mo, Mack 10, Master P, Memphis Bleek, Mia X, Pressha, Public Announcement, Sauce Money, Scarface and more.

The soundtrack made it to number 10 on the Billboard 200 and number 2 on the Top R&B/Hip-Hop Albums chart in the United States.

Track listing

Charts

Weekly charts

Year-end charts

Certifications

References

External links

1998 soundtrack albums
Comedy-drama film soundtracks
Hip hop soundtracks
Albums produced by Bud'da
Albums produced by DJ Clue?
Albums produced by Tim & Bob
Albums produced by Battlecat (producer)